The World Masters was a snooker tournament held in January 1991.

World Masters may also refer to:
 World Masters (darts), one of the longest running and most prestigious professional darts tournaments
 World Dressage Masters, an international dressage series held since 2009
 World Pool Masters Tournament, an annual international nine-ball tournament, known short as World Pool Masters
 World Ranking Masters, ten-pin bowling's international ranking system
 World Tenpin Masters, an annual Ten-pin bowling tournament
 World Masters Games, an international multi-sport event held every four years
 World Masters Athletics, the worldwide governing body for the sport of masters athletics
 World Masters Athletics Championships, biannual championships for athletics events held by the World Masters Athletics
 World Masters Golf, a golf simulation video game for the Super NES released exclusively in Europe